Heighway Pinball was a British company, established in 2012, that manufactured pinball machines. The first table by the company, Full Throttle, was released in 2015.
 The racing-themed game features, as a speciality, a LCD screen for scores, info and animations on the playfield surface at player's eye view.

The company's second machine Alien is based on the movie of the same name and its first sequel Aliens. Production shipment began on 14 February 2017.

As of 26 April 2018, Heighway Pinball had closed the doors on its factory, laid off its employees, and was liquidated soon afterward. The rights to the Alien machine were acquired by Pinball Brothers, a company founded by some of Heighway pinball's investors, who began manufacturing as second run of the game in 2021.

References

British companies established in 2012
Pinball manufacturers
British companies disestablished in 2018